The season 1954–55 the League Algiers Football Association, started on September 18, 1954. and ended on May 29, 1955. This is the 33rd edition of the championships.

Final results

Division Honor

Promotion Honor

First Division 
 Groupe I
 Groupe II
 Groupe III
 Results of Playoffs First Division

Second Division 
 Groupe I
 Groupe II
 Groupe III
 Groupe IV
 Results of Playoffs Second Division

Third Division 
 Groupe I
 Groupe II
 Groupe III
 Groupe IV
 Results of Playoffs Third Division

References

External links
League Algiers

League Algiers Football Association seasons
1954–55 in Algerian football
Algeria